Asghar Nadeem Syed (اصغر ندیم سید) (born 14 January 1950) is a Pakistani playwright, TV drama serial writer and poet. He has written shows for the Pakistani state channel, PTV, STN.

Early life and career
Syed was born in 1950 in the city of Multan. He received his master's degree in Urdu language from the University of Punjab, Lahore and completed his PhD at Bahauddin Zakariya University in Multan. He is married and has three children; a son and two daughters. His son Syed Adeel Hassan is a British National who works for FTSE 100 businesses in the UK. Syed gets inspiration from his son to depict life in foreign lands. Syed is a family man with strong bonds with his son and daughters. Syed wrote the popular TV play Chand Grehan, an Urdu TV drama serial that was one of the highest rated dramas produced by STN, along with "Nijaat" and "Hawain," classic dramas from PTV. One of Syed's works, "Ghulam Gardish" was directed by Nusrat Thakur.

At one time, Asghar Nadeem Syed was a media consultant at the Pakistan Television Corporation.

His dramas depict the social injustices in the society. He has written plays depicting the feudal culture in rural Sindh, exploitation of women, the oligarchic structure in Pakistan comprising politicians, feudals, media moguls and the bureaucracy.

In January 2014, he was wounded by unknown assailants in a gun attack in Lahore while he was returning home from his job as head of the Department of Television, Film and Theatre at Beaconhouse National University in Lahore. The assailants shot at his car when he was near Shaukat Khanum Hospital.

Syed has a total of 36 years of teaching experience.

TV plays
 Pyas (1989) (PTV)
 Nijaat (1993) (aired on PTV)
 Chand Grehan (1995) (aired on Shalimar Television Network)
 Maigh Malhar (1995) (NTM)
 Hawain (1997) (PTV)
 Ghulam Gardish (1998) (PTV)
 Riyasat (2005) (aired on Geo TV)
 Khuda Zameen Se Gaya Nahin (2009) (aired on PTV)
 Bol Meri Machli (aired on Geo TV from 2009-2010)
 Tum Ho Ke Chup (2011) (aired on Geo TV)
 Jaan'nisar (2016–17) (aired on A-Plus Entertainment)

Literary activities
In 2013, he served on the Board of Governors of Pakistan Academy of Letters, an institution of Pakistani scholars and writers. In November 2020, he was appointed as one of the directors of Pakistan Television under the chairmanship of Mr. Naeem Bokhari.

Awards and recognition
 He won Best Writer Award at 9th PTV Awards in 1998
 Pride of Performance Award by the President of Pakistan in 2006
Pakistan Television Corporation Award for Best Writer

Lux Style Awards

Books
 Aadhe Chand Ki Raat
 Tarz-e-Ehsas
 Adhoori Kulliyat

References

External links
Asghar Nadeem Syed on IMDb

1950 births
People from Multan
PTV Award winners
Pakistani dramatists and playwrights
Living people
Place of birth missing (living people)
Academic staff of Beaconhouse National University
Recipients of the Pride of Performance